The Snoopy Show is an animated streaming television series inspired by the Peanuts comic strip by Charles M. Schulz. Developed by Rob Boutilier, Mark Evestaff, and Alex Galatis, and produced by WildBrain, it debuted on February 5, 2021, on Apple TV+. It is the second Peanuts animated series produced for the streaming service, following Snoopy in Space. Each episode consists of three 7-minute segments. Season 2 premiered with the first half on March 11, 2022 while the next half of the season premiered on August 12, 2022. A holiday special was released on December 2, 2022.

Cast and characters 

 Terry McGurrin as Snoopy
 Robert Tinkler as Woodstock
 Ethan Pugiotto (S1-2E3) and Tyler Nathan (S2E4-present) as Charlie Brown
 Isabella Leo as Lucy van Pelt and Patty
 Hattie Kragten as Sally Brown and Violet
 Wyatt White as Linus van Pelt and Shermy
 Milo Toriel-McGibbon as Rerun van Pelt
 Holly Gorski as Marcie
 Isis Moore as Peppermint Patty
 Jacob Soley as Pig-Pen
 Christian Dal Dosso (S1-2E4) and Caleb Bellavance (S2E5-present) as Franklin
 Matthew Mucci as Schroeder
 Robert Tinkler (Season 1) as Spike
 Katie Griffin (Season 1) as Belle
 Cory Doran (Season 1) as Marbles
 Mark Edwards (Season 1) as Andy
 Sean Cullen as Bird Bud #1 and Olaf 
 Julie Lemieux as Bird Bud #2
 David Berni as Bird Bud #3
 Ian James Corlett as Bird Bud #4
 Kirby Morrow (S1-P1) and Sam Vincent (S1-P2,-present) as Bird Bud #5
 Andrew Francis as Bird Bud #6
 Kathleen Barr as Bird Bud #7
 Brian Drummond as Bird Bud #8

Episodes

Series overview

Season 1 (2021)

Season 2 (2022)

Production 
The show was formally announced on October 1, 2020, alongside the release of a teaser trailer. A second trailer for the series followed in January 2021, prior to the series' premiere date. In order to create this show, the producers needed to follow several rules:
 No adults are to be seen or heard. 
 Never show the interior of Snoopy's doghouse. 
 No technology produced beyond the 1970s can be featured.

Rob Boutilier serves as the series' Supervising Director, with Ridd Sorensen, Behzah Mansoori-Dara, and Steve Evangelatos also directing episodes. In addition to co-writing the second and third episodes, Alex Galatis serves as the Executive Story Editor. Josh Scherba, Anne Loi, Stephanie Betts, Paige Braddock, Craig Schulz, and Mark Evestaff (who also co-wrote the second episode) executive produce.

Reception 
On review aggregator Rotten Tomatoes, The Snoopy Show holds an approval rating of 100% based on 6 reviews, with an average score 8.33/10. On Metacritic, the series has a weighted average score of 73 out of 100, based on 5 critics, indicating "generally favorable reviews". The Michigan Daily praised the show, calling it "so darn wholesome". Common Sense Media gave the show a 4/5.

Accolades

References

External links 
 

Apple TV+ original programming
2020s American animated television series
2020s Canadian animated television series
2021 American television series debuts
2021 Canadian television series debuts
American children's animated comedy television series
Canadian children's animated comedy television series
Works based on Peanuts (comic strip)
Television shows based on comic strips
English-language television shows
Television series by DHX Media
Animated television series about dogs
Apple TV+ children's programming